Thikaporn Bunyalieang born 4 June 1989, better known by the stage name Kratay R-Siam, is a Thai luk thung singer under the R-Siam label. She also has a background in Muay Thai and adheres to Hinduism.

Education
She graduated in Bachelor of Architecture from Sri Pathum University.

Career

Kratay is well known for her prowess as a Muay Thai boxer and a pop singer. Her style is Lanna which is northern Thai and is different from more traditional  style. She has recorded and released several albums including best albums (compilation) on the Rsiam label. She is primarily successful in Asian countries (especially Thailand, Cambodia, Japan, China and Taiwan), but she has also performed in Belgium
and France.

Discography

Tee Kao Kayao Dance
This album is a cooperation of Kratae and Kratay, a sister of Kratae and was released on 27 January 2010.
The ten songs on this album are:-
 "Yarng nee tong tee kao" (อย่างนี้ต้องตีเข่า)
 "Dek pump" (เด็กปั๊ม)
 "Sao rum wong" (สาวรำวง)
 "Pok mia ma duay" (พกเมียมาด้วย)
 "Chorp mai" (ชอบมั้ย)
 "Ruk rua lom" (รักเรือล่ม)
 "Mai yark pen praeng see fun" (ไม่อยากเป็นแปรงสีฟัน)
 "Tob mue karng deaw" (ตบมือข้างเดียว)
 "Ma ruk tum mai torn nee" (มารักทำไมตอนนี้)
 "Warng laew chuay tro glub" (ว่างแล้วช่วยโทรกลับ)

Singles 
 "เมรี (Meri)" feat.Kratae Rsiam (24 December 2014)

Movies 
Look Tung Nguen Laan (2013)

Dramas 
Rachanee Look Toong (Ch.8 2012)
Like Mat Sang (Ch.8 2015)

References

External links
Facebook : "Rsiam Kratae"
Instagram : "KRATAE.IG"
iTunes Store : "Kratae iTunes Store"

1989 births
Living people
Atittaya Bunyalieang
Atittaya Bunyalieang
Atittaya Bunyalieang